A Collection of Songs Representing an Enthusiasm for Recording...By Amateurs is a compilation album by The Flaming Lips, released on  on Restless Records.

Track listing

Tracks 10. & 11. Live from the Milestone Club, Charlotte, NC, 9-11-87

References

The Flaming Lips compilation albums
1998 compilation albums
Restless Records compilation albums